Willdenowia: Annals of the Botanic Garden and Botanical Museum Berlin is a triannual peer-reviewed scientific journal on plant, algal, and fungal taxonomy published by the Botanic Garden and Botanical Museum Berlin, Freie Universität Berlin. It was established in 1895 as Notizblatt des Königlichen botanischen Gartens und Museums zu Berlin, and was renamed to the current title in 1954 to honour botanist Carl Ludwig Willdenow (1765-1812), director of the Royal Botanic Garden in Schöneberg near Berlin.

Abstracting and indexing 
The journal is abstracted and indexed in:

References

External links 
Online edition (BioOne)

Botany journals
Publications established in 1895
English-language journals
Biannual journals
1895 establishments in Germany